Drevet may refer to:

 Camille Drevet (1881-1969), French anti-colonialist, feminist, and pacifist activist
 Jacques Drevet (1832-1900), French architect
 Louise Drevet (1835-1898), French novelist
 Drevet family, leading portrait engravers of France